Shacknasty Jim (c. 1851 – 1881) was a Modoc warrior and the leader of the Hot Creek band. His nickname is a corruption of a Modoc name meaning Left-handed Man. His brothers, Jake and Shacknasty Frank, fought under him during the Modoc War. After the plot to assassinate the peace commissioners was carried out, Shacknasty surrendered, and his band went onto the Quapaw Agency Lands. Shacknasty then served as a scout who helped the United States Cavalry hunt down the remaining Modoc warriors.

Shacknasty Jim died of tuberculosis at the Quapaw Indian Agency.

His great-granddaughter is the author Cheewa James.

Sources
The Modoc Indians: A Native American Saga

1851 births
1881 deaths
Native American leaders
Modoc people
People of the Modoc War
19th-century deaths from tuberculosis
Tuberculosis deaths in Oklahoma
19th-century Native Americans